Gvardeysky (masculine), Gvardeyskaya (feminine), or Gvardeyskoye (neuter) may refer to:
Gvardeysky District, a district in Kaliningrad Oblast, Russia
Gvardeysky Urban Okrug, a municipal formation which Gvardeysky District in Kaliningrad Oblast, Russia is incorporated as
Gvardeyskoye Urban Settlement, a former municipal formation which the town of district significance of Gvardeysk in Gvardeysky District of Kaliningrad Oblast, Russia was incorporated as
Gvardeysky, Russia (Gvardeyskaya, Gvardeyskoye), several rural localities in Russia
Gvardeyskiy, Kazakhstan, a village in Almaty Province, Kazakhstan

See also
 Gvardeysk, Kaliningrad Oblast, Russia
 Hvardiiske (disambiguation)
 Krasnogvardeysky (disambiguation)